Garcinia acutifolia is a species of flowering plant in the family Clusiaceae. It is found in Mozambique and Tanzania. It is threatened by habitat loss.

References

acutifolia
Flora of Mozambique
Flora of Tanzania
Vulnerable plants
Taxonomy articles created by Polbot